The President's Hundred Tab/Brassard is a badge awarded by the Civilian Marksmanship Program (CMP) to the 100 top-scoring military and civilian shooters in the President's Pistol and President's Rifle Matches. The tab is authorized for wear on military uniforms of the U.S. Army, U.S. Air Force, and U.S. Coast Guard (enlisted only). The brassard version is authorized for wear on enlisted uniforms of the U.S. Navy. At the top of the brassard are the raised words “PRESIDENT’S” to the left and “HUNDRED” to the right.

History
The National Rifle Association's (NRA) President's Match was instituted at the NRA matches of 1878, as the American Military Rifle Championship Match. It was patterned after an event for British Volunteers called The Queen's Prize, a competition started by Queen Victoria and initiated by the British National Rifle Association in 1860, in order to increase the ability of Britain's marksmen following the Crimean War.

In 1884, the name was changed to the President's Match for the Military Rifle Championship of the United States. It was fired at Creedmoor, New York until 1891. In 1895, it was reintroduced at Sea Girt, New Jersey.

The tradition of making a letter from the President of the United States the first prize began in 1904 when President Theodore Roosevelt, at the conclusion of the President's Match, personally wrote a letter of congratulations to the winner, Private Howard Gensch of the 1st Regiment of Infantry of the New Jersey National Guard.

It cannot be ascertained as to when the President's Match was discontinued; however, it is known that it was not fired during World Wars I and II. It appears to have disappeared during the 1930s and during the Depression when lack of funds severely curtailed the holding of matches of importance.

The President's Match was reinstated in 1957 at the National Matches as "The President's Hundred." The 100 top-scoring competitors in the President's Match were singled out for special recognition in a retreat ceremony in which they passed in review before the winner and former winners of this historic match.

On 27 May 1958, the NRA requested the Deputy Chief of Staff for Personnel's approval of a tab for presentation to each member of the "President's Hundred." NRA's plan was to award the cloth tab together with a metal brassard during the 1958 National Matches. The cloth tab was of high level interest and approved for wear on the uniform on 3 March 1958. The first awards were made at Camp Perry, Ohio, in early September 1958. Only the U.S. Navy has authorized the wear of the metal brassard on the uniforms of enlisted sailors. However, the NRA issued the metal brassard to all military and civilian personnel for wear on the shooting jacket.

In 1977, the National Board for the Promotion of Rifle Practice (NBPRP) assumed responsibility for the President's Match from the NRA. Today the CMP manages and awards the President's Hundred Tab/Brassard to the top 100 shooters in those matches.

In September 2008, the Department of the Army authorized a miniature metal tab to be worn on the new Army Service Uniform. This is a scaled-down replica of the President's Hundred full-color embroidered tab.

In January 2014, the Department of the Air Force, via an update to Air Force Instruction 36–2903, authorized the wear of the President's Hundred Tab on the Airman Battle Uniform (olive drab version) and the Air Force service uniform (miniature full color replica) through the authorization for Airmen to wear any military badge they have earned given it is worn within uniform regulations.

Other tabs
The President's Hundred Tab is one of four permanent individual skill/marksmanship tabs (as compared to a badge) authorized for wear by the U.S. Army. In order of precedence on the uniform, they are the President's Hundred Tab, the Special Forces Tab, the Ranger Tab, and the Sapper Tab. Only three may be worn at one time.

See also
 Badges of the United States Coast Guard
 Badges of the United States Navy
 Marksmanship Badges (United States)
 Tabs of the United States Army

References

United States military badges
Articles containing video clips